The 1971–72 season was Cardiff City F.C.'s 45th season in the Football League. They competed in the 22-team Division Two, then the second tier of English football, finishing nineteenth.

Players

|-
|GK||Jim Eadie||9||0||0||0||2||0||2||0||0||0||13||0||0||0||
|-
|GK||Bill Irwin||31||0||5||0||0||0||0||0||5||0||41||0||0||0||
|-
|GK||Frank Parsons||2||0||0||0||0||0||0||0||0||0||2||0||0||0||
|-
|DF||David Carver||36||0||5||1||0||0||0||0||5||0||46||1||3||0||
|-
|DF||Gary Bell||30||0||5||0||2||0||2||0||4||0||43||0||3||0||
|-
|DF||Steve Derrett||5||0||0(1)||0||0||0||0||0||0||0||5(1)||0||0||0||
|-
|DF||Ken Jones||6||0||0||0||2||0||2||0||0||0||10||0||1||0||
|-
|DF||Richie Morgan||8||0||1||0||0||0||0||0||1||0||10||0||0||0||
|-
|DF||Don Murray||36||0||4||1||2||0||2||0||4||0||48||1||1||0||
|-
|DF||Freddie Pethard||11||0||0||0||0||0||0||0||1||0||12||0||0||0||
|-
|MF||Alan Couch||3||0||0||0||0||0||0||0||0||0||3||0||0||0||
|-
|MF||Alan Foggon||9(3)||0||4||0||1||1||0(1)||0||2||2||16(4)||3||1||0||
|-
|MF||Ian Gibson||40(1)||4||5||0||2||1||2||0||4||0||53(1)||5||4||0||
|-
|MF||Roger Hoy||7||0||0||0||1||0||0||0||0||0||8||0||0||0||
|-
|FW||Billy Kellock||5(1)||0||3||1||0||0||0||0||3||0||11(1)||1||1||0||
|-
|MF||Peter King||22(1)||4||4||1||0||0||2||0||4||0||32(1)||5||0||0||
|-
|MF||Leighton Phillips||41||1||5||0||2||0||2||0||5||0||56||1||3||0||
|-
|MF||Mel Sutton||30(1)||1||1||0||2||0||2||0||3||0||38(1)||1||4||0||
|-
|MF||Tony Villars||6(1)||0||0(1)||0||0||0||0||0||2||0||8(1)||0||1||0||
|-
|MF||Bobby Woodruff||34(2)||6||5||2||2||0||2||0||2(1)||1||46(3)||9||0||0||
|-
|FW||Brian Clark||42||21||5||2||2||1||2||1||5||2||56||28||0||0||
|-
|FW||John Parsons||5(6)||4||0(1)||0||0||0||0||0||0||0||5(7)||4||1||0||
|-
|FW||Bryan Rees||0||0||1||0||0||0||0||0||0||0||1||0||0||0||
|-
|FW||Nigel Rees||10(3)||0||0||0||0||0||0||0||1(1)||0||11(4)||0||0||0||
|-
|FW||Alan Warboys||34(4)||13||2(2)||0||2||0||2||0||4||2||44(6)||15||2||0||
|-
|}
Source.

League standings

Results by round

Fixtures and results

Second Division

Source

Football League Cup

FA Cup

European Cup Winners Cup

Welsh Cup

See also
Cardiff City F.C. seasons

References

Bibliography

Welsh Football Data Archive

Cardiff City F.C. seasons
Association football clubs 1971–72 season
Card